Street Music (German: Straßenmusik) is a 1936 German comedy film directed by Hans Deppe and starring Jessie Vihrog, Fritz Genschow and Ernst Legal. The film's sets were designed by the art director Max Seefelder. It was made by Bavaria Film at the Emelka Studios in Munich.

Plot
Hans, Otto and Paul are unemployed musicians. Grete, a neighbor, supports that the men become street musicians. Otto finds and sells a valuable object to buy alcoholic drinks. Hans spends his money with a widowed woman, Neumann. Meanwhile, Grete has impregnated a woman.

Cast
 Jessie Vihrog as Grete Witt  
 Fritz Genschow as Hans Lünk - Straßenmusikant  
 Hans Deppe as Paul Spittel - Straßenmusikant  
 Ernst Legal as Otto Brommel - Straßenmusikant  
 Fita Benkhoff as Hilde Neumann - eine junge Witwe 
 Karl Valentin as Kürassier-Otto  
 Liesl Karlstadt as Seine Frau  
 Otto Wernicke as Godemann - Gastwirt  
 Josef Eichheim as Der Bräutigam  
 Else Reval as Ottilie Jänicke - die verlassene Braut  
 Ernst Martens as Der Rundfunktintendant 
 Alfons Teuber as Der Rundfunkansager  
 Ernst Fritz Fürbringer as Geschäftsführer im Café 'Dorado'  
 Willem Holsboer as Oberkellner  
 Walter Holten as Ein Kriminalbeamter  
 Hans Kraft as Gerichtsvollzieher

References

Bibliography 
 Jennifer M. Kapczynski & Michael D. Richardson. A New History of German Cinema. Boydell & Brewer, 2014.

External links 
 

1936 films
1936 comedy films
German comedy films
Films of Nazi Germany
1930s German-language films
Films directed by Hans Deppe
German black-and-white films
Bavaria Film films
Films shot at Bavaria Studios
1930s German films